German submarine U-311 was a Type VIIC U-boat of Nazi Germany's Kriegsmarine during World War II. The submarine was laid down on 21 March 1942 at the Flender Werke yard at Lübeck as yard number 311, launched on 20 January 1943 and commissioned on 23 March under the command of Kapitänleutnant Joachim Zander.

During her short career, the U-boat sailed on two combat patrols, sinking a single ship, before she was sunk on 22 April 1944.

Design
German Type VIIC submarines were preceded by the shorter Type VIIB submarines. U-311 had a displacement of  when at the surface and  while submerged. She had two shafts and two  propellers.

U-311 was fitted with five  torpedo tubes (four fitted at the bow and one at the stern), fourteen torpedoes, one  SK C/35 naval gun, 220 rounds, and two twin  C/30 anti-aircraft guns. The boat had a complement of between forty-four and sixty.

Service history

First patrol
After training with the 8th U-boat Flotilla at Kiel, U-311 was transferred to the 1st U-boat Flotilla based at Brest in France, for front-line service on 
25 November 1943. On that day she departed Kiel and sailed out into the middle of the Atlantic, via the North Sea and the gap between Iceland and the Faroe Islands. She operated as part of 8 wolfpacks before arriving at Brest on 26 January 1944.

Second patrol and loss
U-311 sailed from Brest on 7 March 1944.

Previously recorded fate
The boat was previously thought to have been sunk southwest of Ireland on 24 April 1944 by a Canadian Sunderland flying boat of 423 Squadron, RCAF.

Wolfpacks
U-311 took part in eight wolfpacks, namely:
 Coronel (7 – 8 December 1943) 
 Coronel 1 (8 – 14 December 1943) 
 Coronel 2 (14 – 17 December 1943) 
 Amrum (18 – 23 December 1943) 
 Rügen 5 (23 December 1943 – 2 January 1944) 
 Rügen 4 (2 – 7 January 1944) 
 Rügen (7 – 19 January 1944) 
 Preussen (19 – 22 March 1944)

Summary of raiding history

References

https://legionmagazine.com/en/2020/04/hmcs-matane-meets-a-u-boat/

Bibliography

External links

German Type VIIC submarines
U-boats commissioned in 1943
U-boats sunk in 1944
World War II submarines of Germany
World War II shipwrecks in the Atlantic Ocean
U-boats sunk by Canadian warships
U-boats sunk by depth charges
1943 ships
Ships built in Lübeck
Ships lost with all hands
Maritime incidents in April 1944